Beale Memorial Clock Tower is a clock tower located in Bakersfield, California. It was a gift to the city; built by Truxtun Beale in memory of his mother, Mary Edwards Beale. It was dedicated on April 4, 1904, and was built in the middle of the intersection of 17th St. and Chester Ave. When he was ambassador to Spain, Beale was inspired by a clock tower he saw there. He hired architect Clinton Day to design it.

In 1910, the Bakersfield and Kern Electric Railway started planning a double track upgrade on the South Chester Line. The Beale Clock Tower was right in the path of that line upgrade. On January 22, 1912, the Bakersfield City Council voted to remove the clock tower. However, after protest from citizens, and Truxtun Beale, who built it only eight years earlier, it was decided to leave the clock tower. Tracks were built around it, which would create future traffic problems. However, the citizens at the time were content to drive around the narrow space.

The clock tower continued to stand until the 1952 Kern County earthquake sequence took place in July and August. Being damaged by the earthquake, the city council again voted to demolish it. The only parts to survive were: the clock works, bell, iron spiral stairwell, balcony railings, and arch iron grillwork.

In 1961, a group of local citizens organized an effort to rebuild the clock tower. The new clock tower would be built in front of the Kern County Museum on Chester Ave, approximately 1.25 miles north of its original location. It was dedicated on December 13, 1964 to the County of Kern.

References

Buildings and structures in Bakersfield, California
Landmarks in Bakersfield, California
Clock towers in California
Buildings and structures completed in 1904